Elections were held in Illinois on Tuesday, November 5, 1974. 

Primaries were held on March 19, 1974.

Election information
1974 was a midterm election year in the United States.

Turnout
Turnout in the primary election was 30.09%, with a total of 1,817,804 ballots cast. 1,174,231 Democratic and 643,573 Republican primary ballots were cast.

Turnout during the general election was 52.23%, with 3,084,675 ballots cast.

Federal elections

United States Senate

Incumbent Democrat Adlai Stevenson III was reelected.

United States House 

All 24 Illinois seats in the United States House of Representatives were up for election in 1974.

The Democratic Party flipped three seats, leaving the party composition of Illinois' House delegation as 13 Democratic and 11 Republican.

State elections

Treasurer 

Incumbent Treasurer Alan J. Dixon, a Democrat, won reelection to a second term.

Democratic primary
Incumbent Alan J. Dixon won renomination, running unopposed.

Republican primary
Harry Page defeated Jeannette H. Mullen in the Republican primary.

General election

State Senate
Seats in the Illinois Senate were up for election in 1974. Democrats flipped control of the chamber.

State House of Representatives
Seats in the Illinois House of Representatives were up for election in 1974. Democrats flipped control of the chamber.

Trustees of University of Illinois

An election was held for three of nine seats for Trustees of University of Illinois system. 

The election saw the election of new members, Democrats Robert J. Lenz, Nina T. Shepherd, and Arthur R.  Velasquez.

First-term Republican Russel W. Steger, and fellow Republican Timothy W. Swain (who had been appointed in 1955, and had been elected to three full terms since) both lost reelection. Third-term Republican Earl M. Hughes was not renominated.

Judicial elections
Multiple judicial positions were up for election in 1974.

Ballot measure
Illinois voters voted on a single ballot measure in 1974. In order to be approved, the measure required either 60% support among those specifically voting on the measure or 50% support among all ballots cast in the elections.

This marked the first time that Illinois voters voted on a proposed amendment to the 1970 Constitution of Illinois following its adoption.

Restrict Governor's Amendatory Veto Power Amendment
Voters rejected the Restrict Governor's Amendatory Veto Power Amendment, a measure which would have amended Amends Article IV, Section 9, Paragraph (e) of the Constitution of Illinois failed to meet either threshold to amend the constitution. It would have restricted the amendatory veto power given to the governor, which allows the governor to return bills to the legislature with suggested changes.

Local elections
Local elections were held.

Among the local elections was a referendum in  Cook, DuPage, Kane, Lake, McHenry and Will counties which created Regional Transportation Authority.

References

 
Illinois